Janicat (Greek: Γιαννιτσάτι or Γιαννιτσάτες) is a settlement in the Vlorë County, southwestern Albania. At the 2015 local government reform it became part of the municipality Finiq.

Notable people
Katina Papa

Sources 

Greek communities in Albania
Populated places in Finiq
Villages in Vlorë County